South Huntington is an affluent hamlet and census-designated place (CDP) within the Town of Huntington in Suffolk County, on Long Island, in New York, United States. The population was 9,422 at the 2010 census. Residents have a Huntington Station postal address.

South Huntington is the birthplace of Walt Whitman, and the Walt Whitman Shops Mall is nearby. It is also home to St. Anthony's High School, Walt Whitman High School and the South Huntington Public Library.
The Walt Whitman Shops were previously known as the Walt Whitman Shopping Center. The department store chain Abraham & Straus purchased 45 acres in South Huntington in 1956 to build a shopping mall and parking lot. An A & S store would be built as the centerpiece of the mall. The groundbreaking ceremony for the shopping center took place on April 20, 1961. The first store to open, on March 28, 1962, was Abraham & Straus, followed by Macy's on September 18, 1962. The official opening for the entire shopping center was in November 1962. It was the first enclosed shopping center on Long Island. The mall had 75 stores, lighted fountains, and a reflecting pool. The parking lot had spaces for 5,000 cars.

Renovations at the mall took place in 1998, including changes to the main concourse and an elevated parking deck. Also in this time period, three new department stores were added. Bloomingdale's opened on August 5, 1998 followed by Lord & Taylor on November 11, 1998. Saks Fifth Avenue opened its doors on March 11, 1999. A second renovation was completed in November 2013. This included adding 70,000 square feet to the facility as well as doing exterior remodeling.  A statue of Walt Whitman was also added.

Walt Whitman Shops is currently owned by the Simon Property Group.

Geography

Demographics

As of the census of 2000, there were 9,465 people, 3,299 households, and 2,533 families residing in the CDP. The population density was 2,802.0 per square mile (1,081.2/km2). There were 3,379 housing units at an average density of 1,000.3/sq mi (386.0/km2). The racial makeup of the CDP was 93.47% White, 0.85% African American, 0.06% Native American, 3.55% Asian, 0.82% from other races, and 1.25% from two or more races. Hispanic or Latino of any race were 3.76% of the population.

There were 3,299 households, out of which 32.3% had children under the age of 18 living with them, 64.2% were married couples living together, 9.4% had a female householder with no husband present, and 23.2% were non-families. 17.7% of all households were made up of individuals, and 7.3% had someone living alone who was 65 years of age or older. The average household size was 2.77 and the average family size was 3.14.

In the CDP, the population was spread out, with 22.4% under the age of 18, 5.1% from 18 to 24, 31.8% from 25 to 44, 24.1% from 45 to 64, and 16.6% who were 65 years of age or older. The median age was 40 years. For every 100 females, there were 93.8 males. For every 100 females age 18 and over, there were 90.0 males.

The median income for a household in the CDP was $177,950, and the median income for a family was $184,828. Males had a median income of $60,440 versus $41,867 for females. The per capita income for the CDP was $34,011. About 3.3% of families and 4.4% of the population were below the poverty line, including 3.5% of those under age 18 and 8.9% of those age 65 or over.

Median real estate property taxes paid for housing units with mortgages in 2009: $6,918 (1.6%)
Median real estate property taxes paid for housing units with no mortgage in 2009: $6,446 (1.6%)

Education
St. Anthony's High School opened on Sept. 12, 1984 at the former site of Holy Family High School. Formerly an all-boys high school in Smithtown, St. Anthony's student body was moved to the new location in South Huntington when the Diocese of Rockville Centre decided to close Holy Family High School.  The major factor for the closure of Holy Family was declining enrollment. The move of St. Anthony's to South Huntington sparked protests by parents and students.

Funding for the 48 classroom Walt Whitman High School was approved in February 1950. A new high school was needed because of the large population growth in the school district.  The cost of over $3,100,000 included purchasing 32 acres in South Huntington. Capacity for the school was set at 1,500. Groundbreaking took place on March 14, 1955.  The school opened on Sept. 6, 1956.

Enrollment for the 2015–16 school year for Walt Whitman High School was 1,898.

The 49,000 square foot South Huntington Public Library, located at 145 Pidgeon Hill Road, opened to the public on July 24, 2004. The construction of the library was funded by an $11.9 million bond referendum passed on December 5, 2000 by a margin of 1,532 to 1,493. Reasons for construction of the new library included need for additional space to house the library's collections, additional computers and updated technology for patrons and a larger community room for programs.  An added feature on the grounds of the library is an outdoor garden with patio seating.

The library was built on the site of the former Pidgeon Hill Elementary School.

Transportation
Walt Whitman Shops is a major hub for bus routes in the area. The following routes terminate there:
 S23 to Babylon via Wyandanch
 S29 to Babylon via Deer Park Avenue
 S54 to Patchogue
 H20 to Huntington
 H30 to Huntington via Greenlawn
 H40 to Northport
 N79 to Hicksville

The S1 bus along New York State Route 110 also serves it while en route to either Amityville or Halesite.

References

External links
South Huntington Public Library
Walt Whitman High School

Huntington, New York
Census-designated places in New York (state)
Hamlets in New York (state)
Census-designated places in Suffolk County, New York
Hamlets in Suffolk County, New York